Katerynivka is a village in Sievierodonetsk Raion of Luhansk Oblast of eastern Ukraine. The village came under control of the self-proclaimed Luhansk People's Republic in June 2022.

The War in Donbass, that started in mid-April 2014, has brought along both civilian and military casualties. In this war the village was located in a "gray zone" between Ukrainian forces and forces loyal to the Luhansk People's Republic until on 4 February 2018 the Ukrainian army took the village under its control.

Demographics
In 2001 the settlement had 484 inhabitants. Native language as of the Ukrainian Census of 2001:
Ukrainian — 74.36%
Russian — 25.84%

References

Villages in Sievierodonetsk Raion